St. George Terminal is a ferry, railway, bus, and park and ride transit center in the St. George neighborhood of Staten Island, New York City. It is located at the intersection of Richmond Terrace and Bay Street, near Staten Island Borough Hall, Richmond County Bank Ballpark and Richmond County Supreme Court. St. George is one of the few remaining rail-boat connections in the United States.

History

A ferry and rail terminal at the St. George site (then called St. George's Landing) and an extension of the Staten Island Railway (then called Staten Island Rapid Transit) north from Vanderbilt's Landing (today's Clifton Station) had been proposed in the 1870s by the owners of the Staten Island Railroad, George Law, Cornelius Vanderbilt, and Erastus Wiman, to replace the various ferry sites on the north and east shores of Staten Island. St. George was selected due to it being the closest point from Staten Island to Manhattan, about a  distance. The terminal and the local neighborhood were renamed to St. George in honor of Law, allegedly as a concession by Wiman in order to build the terminal and connecting tunnel on land owned by Law. An extension of the line to Tompkinsville was opened in 1884, and the tunnel between Tompkinsville and the terminal was constructed from 1884 to 1885. The ferry terminal was opened in early 1886, while the rail terminal opened in March of that year. The terminal's entrance building would be opened in 1897.

The St. George rail terminal as originally built was constructed of wood, with no overhead obstructions. Adjacent to the station was a large freight terminal called the St. George Yard, where the Baltimore and Ohio Railroad's freight operations exchanged with car floats to other terminals in the New York Harbor. The B&O also operated the Staten Island Rapid Transit and ferries under a 99-year lease signed in 1885. A trolley terminal for the Staten Island Electric Company was formerly located above the ferryhouse.

After the Municipal takeover of the Staten Island Ferry service, a new St. George Ferry Terminal Complex was designed by Carrère and Hastings and opened in 1905.  As part of this construction, the St. George tunnel was lengthened. It was built with two portals at its north end; one on the geographic east side currently in use by the Staten Island Railway, and an additional western portal intended for the Staten Island Tunnel, which would have traveled across the Narrows and connected to the New York City Subway's BMT Fourth Avenue Line in Brooklyn. In 1923 an excavation shaft for the Narrows tunnel was constructed at the south end of the terminal near Shore Road, though construction was halted in 1925. In 1930, civic leaders proposed a $2.5 million ferry terminal to replace the existing complex, with an underground train terminal below a 26-story office development. However, this plan was never carried out.

On June 25, 1946, a large fire destroyed both the wooden ferry and rail terminals, killing three people. Full service was restored in July of that year. A new facility was built by the city, opening on June 8, 1951, which led the tunneling shaft to be filled in. The new facility cost $21 million. The former freight yard was replaced by a New York City Department of Transportation municipal parking lot when the new terminal opened; the parking lot has since been replaced by Richmond County Bank Ballpark.

The station served as the northern (eastern) terminus for the Staten Island Railway North Shore Branch to Arlington and Port Ivory until its closure in 1953. The line used tracks 11 and 12 on the north end of the terminal, which are currently unused.

Plans for a renovation of the ferry terminal were announced in March 1997, and it received renovations in the 2000s as part of a $300 million renovation of several ferry terminals in the area, including the St. George and Whitehall Terminals. St. George's direct rail-boat connection is one of a few remaining in the United States.

The MTA announced in late 2022 that it would open customer service centers at 15 stations; the centers would provide services such as travel information and OMNY farecards. The first six customer service centers, including one at St. George Terminal, were to open in early 2023. St. George Terminal's customer service center opened at the beginning of March 2023.

Ferry terminal

St. George Terminal is the southern terminal of the Staten Island Ferry; it runs only to Whitehall Terminal, on the southern tip of Manhattan near Battery Park. The Staten Island Ferry runs a 24-hour service between the terminals. Ferries usually run at 15-to-20-minute intervals during rush hours and every 30 minutes at other times.

In January 2019, NYC Ferry announced that it would start operating its St. George route in 2020. The route was originally supposed to run from the St. George Terminal to Battery Park City Ferry Terminal and West Midtown Ferry Terminal in Manhattan. However, due to concerns that the massive Staten Island Ferry boats and the small NYC Ferry craft might not be able to share a dock, the New York City Economic Development Corporation announced in January 2020 that a NYC Ferry dock would instead be built close to the existing terminal, on the opposite side of Empire Outlets closer to the Richmond County Bank Ballpark. NYC Ferry service began operating in August 2021.

Staten Island Railway station

The railroad station, which is known as the St. George station, opened on March 7, 1886. It is the northern terminus of the main line of the Staten Island Railway, which operates 24/7. It is also one of two stations that require the US$2.75 fare on entry and exit, the other being Tompkinsville. This station is handicapped-accessible.

This station is situated in an open cut below street level, with a four-lane bus terminal and parking lot above it. The station has five active platforms and ten tracks, numbered 1 through 10 from east to west. All tracks end at bumper blocks at their railroad northern (geographic eastern) ends. There is also a sixth island platform with two additional tracks (11 and 12) to the west (geographic north) no longer in revenue service, which historically served the Staten Island Rapid Transit's North Shore Branch. It currently acts as a passageway to the North Municipal Parking Field on Richmond Terrace, and towards Richmond County Bank Ballpark, one of two access points to this station. The track ballast is present through this construction zone. The mezzanine area has separate fare control areas: the east side for passengers entering, and the west side is for passengers exiting. Station booths and MetroCard vending machines are located on both sides. Just before each platform bay are the old destination indicators to the left and right of each platform entrance, corresponding to each departing track. There are green bulbs above these displays that indicate where the next train will be leaving from. This station originally opened with nothing overhead; no bus bays and no ramps. It was the site of a 1946 fire that nearly destroyed the terminal.

Just south of the station towards Tompkinsville, the Staten Island Railway runs in the system's only tunnel, known as the St. George Tunnel.

Station layout

New York City Bus

The Metropolitan Transportation Authority operates a number of bus routes in Staten Island, New York, United States. Some of them are the direct descendants of streetcar lines (see list of streetcar lines in Staten Island).

Departures are given below by loading bay.

Nearby attractions
 National Lighthouse Museum
 St. George Theatre
 Staten Island September 11 Memorial

References

External links

 Staten Island current ferry fleet
 Entrance from Google Maps Street View
 Train at the terminal from Google Maps Street View
 Platforms from Google Maps Street View

Transportation buildings and structures in Staten Island
Ports and harbors of New York (state)
Staten Island Ferry
Staten Island Railway stations
Railway stations in the United States opened in 1884
Port of New York and New Jersey
Transit centers in the United States
Bus stations in New York City
MTA Regional Bus Operations
Ferry terminals in New York City
1884 establishments in New York (state)
St. George, Staten Island
Railway stations serving harbours and ports